The Flying Jalopy is a 1943 animated short film featuring Donald Duck.  It was released by Walt Disney Productions.

Plot
Donald goes to a "used" plane lot run by Ben Buzzard takes one of the junk planes out for a test spin.  Before doing so, he must sign a life insurance policy with Buzzard as the beneficiary. Buzzard then attempts several schemes to get Donald to crash.

Voice cast
Clarence Nash as Donald Duck
Nestor Paiva as Ben Buzzard

Home media
The short was released on December 6, 2005 on Walt Disney Treasures: The Chronological Donald, Volume Two: 1942-1946.

References

External links
 
 

1943 films
1943 animated films
1940s Disney animated short films
Donald Duck short films
Films produced by Walt Disney